707 may refer to:
 707 (number), a number
 707 (band), an American rock band
 AD 707, a year in the 8th century
 707 BC, a year in the 8th century BC
 The 7 July 2005 London bombings, a terrorist attack
 707th Special Mission Unit, a military unit in South Korea
 Area code 707, for telephones in northwestern California
 Boeing 707, a passenger airplane
 Avro 707, an experimental airplane
 Roland TR-707, a drum machine
 Submarine 707R, an anime and manga
 707, a character from the game Mystic Messenger 
 British Rail Class 707, an electric multiple unit train built by Siemens